The men's 100 metres at the 2009 World Championships in Athletics were held at the Olympic Stadium on August 15 and August 16. The two main contenders for the event were the reigning World Champion Tyson Gay and Usain Bolt, the reigning Olympic champion and world record holder. Gay entered the competition with a season's best of 9.77 seconds (an American record) while Bolt's season's best was 9.79 seconds. Four other competitors had broken the 10-second barrier during the last months before the World Championship: former world record holder Asafa Powell, Olympic finalist Churandy Martina and emerging sprinters Daniel Bailey and Mike Rodgers.

The first day saw a number of high-profile athletes eliminated; Derrick Atkins, the 2007 silver medallist, did not pass the first round. Churandy Martina, area record holders Samuel Francis and Olusoji Fasuba, Simeon Williamson, and 2003 gold medallist Kim Collins were all knocked out in the quarter finals. Also, a double false start meant disqualification for the new European junior record holder Christophe Lemaitre. Gay, Powell and Rodgers ended with the fastest times of the day, although Bolt and Bailey comfortably won heat five, exchanging smiles and glances in the process. The semi-finals saw Bolt—typically slow out of the blocks—false start for the first time over 100 m, but he eventually finished in 9.89 seconds (the fastest ever semi-final). Six of the eight qualifying athletes broke 10 seconds, and US champion Rodgers was the biggest name not to qualify.

The final, which was advertised in Berlin as "Das Duell" between Gay and Bolt, proved to be historic. By the 20-metre mark, Bolt had already taken a slight lead of 0.01 seconds, and he continued to pull away from the rest of the pack until the finish. He finished in a world record-breaking time of 9.58 seconds, beating Gay by some distance, even though the American had run 9.71 seconds, which was the third fastest time ever. Bolt beat his own previous mark by over a tenth of a second, an achievement statisticians claimed was 20 years ahead of schedule in the long term scheme of the 100 metres world record progression. So emphatic was Bolt's winning time, that both bronze medal winner Powell and sixth placed Dwain Chambers said they were happy just taking part in the fastest race in history.

Medalists

Records
Prior to the competition, the records were as follows:

The following new world, championship and North American records were set during the competition.

Qualification standards

Schedule

Results

Heats
Qualification: First 3 in each heat (Q) and the next 4 fastest (q) advance to the quarterfinals.

Quarterfinals
Qualification: First 3 in each heat(Q) and the next 1 fastest(q) advance to the semifinals.

Semifinals
First 4 of each Semifinal will be directly qualified(Q) for the Finals.

Semifinal 1

Semifinal 2

Final

References
General
100 metres results from IAAF (Archived 2009-09-08). IAAF. Retrieved on 2009-08-15.
Specific

External links
Biomechanical analysis of the sprinters splits in the semi-final and final. from the IAAF
Statistical analysis of Bolt and Powell's speed in the final from the IAAF
 from Universal Sports

100
100 metres at the World Athletics Championships